Stephan Luckhaus is a German mathematician who is a professor at the University of Leipzig working in pure and applied analysis. His PhD was obtained in 1978 under the supervision of Willi Jäger at the University of Heidelberg. He was elected to the German Academy of Sciences Leopoldina in 2007.

References

External links
Website at the University of Leipzig

Year of birth missing (living people)
Living people
20th-century German mathematicians
Mathematical analysts
21st-century German mathematicians